Sir Thomas Elder,  (5 August 1818 – 6 March 1897), was a Scottish-Australian pastoralist, highly successful businessman, philanthropist, politician, race-horse owner and breeder, and public figure. Amongst many other things, he is notable for introducing camels to Australia.

Early years
Elder was born at Kirkcaldy, Scotland, the fourth son of George Elder, merchant, and his wife Joanna Haddow, née Lang.

Thomas' second eldest brother, Alexander Lang Elder (1815–1885), went to South Australia in 1839 and founded the firm of Elder and Company in Adelaide. He was joined by his brothers William (1813–1882) and George (1816–1897). In 1846 George and Alex went into partnership with experienced pastoralist W.S. Peter to establish a sheep run they named Warrow Station, located at Coulta near Port Lincoln. In August 1851 Alex was elected a member of the Legislative Council for West Adelaide. He resigned his seat in March 1853, and left South Australia. He settled in London in 1855, and acted as agent for the Adelaide company until 1884, when he and his sons established A. L. Elder & Company. William left Adelaide soon after Alexander. George left in 1855.

South Australia
Thomas Elder migrated to Adelaide in 1854 and worked with George for a year. After George departed, Thomas formed Elder, Stirling & Co, a partnership with Edward Stirling, Robert Barr Smith and John Taylor. In 1856 Barr Smith married Thomas Elder's sister Joanna, and on Stirling and Taylor's retirement in 1863, Barr Smith and Thomas Elder formed Elder Smith and Co. In 1875, with Andrew Tennant, they formed the Adelaide Steamship Company.

In 1864 he persuaded Arthur Hardy to sell him his Glen Osmond home "Birksgate", which he developed considerably. In 1897 it passed to his nephew T. E. Barr Smith.

Pastoralist
Elder also had other important interests. In partnership with Robert Barr Smith, they acquired Nilpena Station in 1859. He became associated with Peter Waite in the Paratoo run in 1862, in the same year bought Beltana station, and eventually became the owner of an enormous tract of country. Other properties Thomas acquired during this time included Ketchowla Station, Oulnina, Anabama, Tualkilky, Grampus, Ouratan and Netley. He was said to have held at one time a pastoral area greater in extent than the whole of Scotland. Much of this was land with a very low rainfall, and Elder spent a great deal of money sinking artesian wells, making dams and fencing. In January 1866 he imported 120 camels from India with "Afghan" attendants, which were of much use in the dry areas and in conveying supplies from Port Augusta. In 1868 he chartered Henry Simpson's Kohinoor to return the "Afghans" and bring out another 60 camels and a fresh contingent of attendants. They became an important factor in the development of the northern area of South Australia.

Investor, politician, race horses, vigneron
Elder was very fortunate in his mining ventures. Early in the sixties he had large interests in the Moonta and Wallaroo copper-mines which brought him in a huge fortune. He entered political life as a member of the South Australian Legislative Council in 1863 but retired in 1869. He was again elected in 1871, but resigned in 1878 and took no further part in politics.

Elder was much interested in horses and made the breeding of blood stock a hobby. He was a leading racing man between 1875 and 1884 and had the highest reputation. It was well known that any horse bearing his colours was in the race to win. He sold his race-horses in 1884 but continued his stud.

Elder also had interests in the wine industry and was quite successful in exhibitions in Adelaide and London. He was also a founder of the Tintara Vineyard company in 1862.

Philanthropy
Elder encouraged exploration, contributed largely to Warburton's 1873 expedition and Giles's in 1875, supplying camels in each case, which proved to be of the greatest value. He also contributed liberally to the cost of other explorations, and in no case sought or obtained any return for himself. On one occasion he offered £5,000 on condition that a like sum was subscribed by the public to finance an expedition to the Southern Ocean, but the condition was not fulfilled.

He supported every kind of manly sport and his benefactions both private and public were widespread and almost without limit.

The Art Gallery of South Australia received a bequest of £25,000, and many of the finest pictures of the gallery were purchased from this fund. He contributed substantially to the Library's acquisition program. He himself published a small booklet in 1893: Notes from a Pocket Journal of a Trip up the River Murray in 1856, recounting a voyage in the steamer Gundagai.

In 1874 he gave £20,000 towards an endowment fund for the newly established University of Adelaide, and on his death in 1897 bequeathed a further £65,000 to the University, £20,000 of which was for a School of Music. The Elder Conservatorium of Music perpetuates his name. Elder's combined gifts and bequests to the University amount to nearly £100,000.

Elder Professor of Mathematics
One of Elder's bequests established and funded the first professorships at the fledgeling University; the Elder Professor of Mathematics and Natural Philosophy; and the Elder Professor of Natural Sciences. The first incumbent, Sir Horace Lamb, an applied mathematician, lectured in pure and applied mathematics as well as giving instruction in practical physics. After Lamb's resignation in 1885 to take up a post at Owens College, Manchester, separate Chairs in Mathematics and Physics were established. The Elder Chair of Mathematics at the University of Adelaide has been held by many eminent mathematicians, including Nobel Prize winner Sir William Henry Bragg. 
1. Sir Horace Lamb M.A. Sc.D. 1875–1885 (Elder Professor of Mathematics and Natural Philosophy)
2. Sir William Henry Bragg M.A. OM KBE PRS 1886–1908
3. Sir Robert William Chapman M.A. B.E. CMG Kt 1909–1919
4. John Raymond Wilton B.Sc. M.A. D.Sc. 1920–1944
5. Harold William Sanders B.A. M.A. 1944–1958
6. Eric Stephen Barnes B.A.Hons. M.A. Ph.D. 1959–1974
7. Ren Potts B.Sc.Hons. D.Phil. D.Sc. AO 1976–1990
8. Ernie Tuck B.Sc.Hons. Ph.D. 1991-2002
9. Charles E. M. Pearce B.Sc. M.Sc. Ph.D. 2005-2012
10. Mathai Varghese B.A. Ph.D. 2013-

Elder Professor of Physics
1. Sir William Henry Bragg M.A. OM KBE PRS 1886–1908
2. Sir Kerr Grant B.Sc.(Hons.) M.Sc. KCB 1911–1948
3. Sir Leonard George Holden Huxley M.A. D.Phil. KBE 1949–1959
4. John Henry Carver M.Sc. Ph.D. Sc.D. 1961–1978
5. John Russell Prescott B.Sc.(Hons.) Ph.D. D.Phil. 1982–1990
6. Anthony William (Tony) Thomas B.Sc.(Hons.) Ph.D. D.Sc.1990-

Elder Professor of Music
As well as later funding the Elder Conservatorium, Sir Thomas helped to establish the Elder Professorship of Music in 1883, with the first incumbent taking up the post in 1884. At the same time, Sir Thomas established endowment funds in parallel for the Royal College of Music in London and the Music Board of the University of Adelaide to support the Elder Overseas Scholarship (in Music).

All of the Elder Professors of Music have also served as Director/Dean of the Elder Conservatorium, providing artistic and academic leadership both in the Conservatorium and in the Faculties/Schools of Music/Performing Arts of which it has been part.
1. Joshua Ives Mus.Bac.(Cantab.) 1884–1901
2. J. Matthew Ennis D.Mus.(Adel.) 1902–1918
3. E. Harold Davies Mus.Bac. D.Mus.(Adel.)1918–1948
4. John Bishop OBE 1946–1966, pianist and arts administrator
5. David Galliver M.A.(Oxon.) AM 1966–1983, tenor
6. Heribert Esser M.Mus. 1986–1993, conductor
7. Charles Bodman Rae M.A.(Cantab.), DMus(Adel.), Ph.D. D.Mus.(Leeds) since 2001-, composer

Elder Professor of Anatomy and Histology
The first two incumbents of this position were known as the Elder Professor of Anatomy. It became the Elder Professor of Anatomy and Histology on the appointment of Professor Herbert Woollard in 1928.
 Archibald Watson M.D. F.R.C.S. 1885–1919
 Frederic Wood Jones B.Sc. M.B.B.S. M.D. 1920–1927
 Herbert Henry Woollard M.B.B.S. M.D. 1928–1929
 Herbert John Wilkinson B.A. M.B.Ch.B. M.D. 1930–1936
 Frank Goldby M.B.Ch.B. 1937-1944–* Andrew Arthur Abbie B.S. M.D. D.Sc. 1945-1970
 Janis Priedkalns B.V.Sc. M.A. Ph.D. 1972–1996

In 1996 the Wood Jones Professor of Biological Anthropological and Comparative Anatomy, named for the second Elder Professor of Anatomy, was established from an endowment by Professor Ray Last (1903–1993), who studied under Wood Jones in the 1920s before embarking on a successful career as a surgeon and teacher in Australia and the United Kingdom. The foundation Wood Jones Chair (1996-) is Professor Maciej Henneberg Ph.D. D.Sc.

Others
 Ralph Tate, Elder Professor of Natural Sciences 1875–1901
 Edward Rennie M.A. D.Sc., Elder Professor of Chemistry 1886–1927

Later years
He had a severe illness in 1887 and shortly afterwards retired. Elder Smith and Company was formed into a public company, and Elder afterwards lived chiefly in the country. He never married. Elder was knighted in 1878 and created Knight Grand Cross of the Order of St Michael and St George (GCMG) in 1887. He died at Mount Lofty on 6 March 1897.

Legacy
Elder is commemorated in the scientific name of a species of Australian gecko, Strophurus elderi.

See also
Elder Conservatorium
Elders Limited

References

1818 births
1897 deaths
Settlers of South Australia
Australian Knights Grand Cross of the Order of St Michael and St George
Members of the South Australian Legislative Council
Businesspeople from Adelaide
Adelaide Club
19th-century Australian politicians
People from Kirkcaldy
Scottish emigrants to colonial Australia
19th-century Australian businesspeople